The 2010 EuroBOSS Series season was the tenth year of the EuroBOSS Series. The championship began on 8 August at Magny-Cours and was due to finish on 31 October at Portimão, after five double-header rounds. However, the last three race meetings were called off due to the lack of driver entries to the series. This meant the season ended with the Slovakiaring round on 22 August.

With two wins and two second places from the four races held, Damien Charveriat won the EuroBOSS class at the wheel of his Zele Racing Dallara GP2/05 that had been formerly run in the GP2 Series. Andreas Zuber, himself a former GP2 racer, was the only other driver to compete in the class, winning both races at the Slovakiaring. As single entrants in the EuroBOSS Masters Class and the EuroBOSS Invitation Class respectively, Peter Milavec – double winner at the Slovakiaring – and Jean-Pierre Clement – one race win at Magny-Cours – won their classes unopposed. The EuroBOSS 3000 Class had the most competitors over the season, with four drivers competing in the two meetings. Gerhard Hille finished as class winner, taking a win and two second places to beat Norbert Groer by ten points.

Drivers

Race calendar
The calendar had consisted of five double-header meetings.

References

External links
EuroBOSS.com

Euroboss